Asteropsis is a genus of South American plant in the tribe Astereae within the family Asteraceae.

 Species
 Asteropsis macrocephala Less. - Uruguay, Rio Grande do Sul  
 Asteropsis megapotamica (Spreng.) Marchesi & al. - Rio Grande do Sul

References

Astereae
Asteraceae genera